Zebrahead is an American rap-punk band from La Habra, California. Formed in 1996, the band has released thirteen studio albums to date.

History

1996–2001: Formation and early years 

Zebrahead was formed in La Habra, California in summer 1996 by guitarist Greg Bergdorf and drummer Ed Udhus, (both formerly of the band 409), bassist Ben Osmundson (formerly of 3-Ply) and singer/rhythm guitarist Justin Mauriello (formerly of Once There). All four musicians, whose bands at the time shared the same practice space, became acquainted with one another after experimenting with different music styles together. This led to all four leaving their respective bands and forming their own and naming it Zebrahead. Inspired by bands such as Fugazi and Descendents and uninterested in the local musical trends of the time, Zebrahead began experimenting and incorporating elements of hip-hop into their sound, leading to the inclusion of rapper Ali Tabatabaee as a co-vocalist.  The first song ever composed was "Check", which was later included on their first demo tape, One More Hit, released shortly after.

The band issued their self-titled debut album in April 1998 through indie label Doctor Dream Records, before signing with major label Columbia Records to release their mainstream debut Waste of Mind later that year. The album contains several re-recorded songs from their demo release alongside new tracks, including the minor radio hit "Get Back", which charted at No. 32 on the U.S. Hot Modern Rock Tracks charts. The band's follow-up Playmate of the Year was released in August 2000 and charted at No.4 on the U.S. Top Heatseekers chart. The extended play Stupid Fat Americans followed in February 2001 as a Japan-exclusive release.

2002–2005: MFZB and Mauriello's departure 
Zebrahead recorded and released their fourth studio album, MFZB, in 2003; this was their last publication under Columbia Records. The album is noted for trading in the hip-hop funk elements of the band's previous releases in favor of a heavier punk rock sound that would eventually carry over and develop in future releases. Zebrahead spent the majority of 2004 promoting the album at various festivals in Japan, including the Summer Sonic Festival. The band's extensive touring earned them a sizeable fanbase in the country, leading MFZB to chart at No.9 on the Japanese Charts and earn a gold certification. A follow-up to MFZB titled Waste of MFZB – containing songs that didn't make the final cut of the former – was released exclusively in Japan in July 2004 where it topped the Billboard Japan chart.

Shortly after Zebrahead's Japanese tour, co-vocalist/rhythm guitarist Justin Mauriello left the band due to creative differences. As the singing/rapping dynamic between Mauriello and co-vocalist Ali Tabatabaee was crucial to Zebrahead's sound, the band immediately began the search for a replacement. Matty Lewis, a former member of the band Jank 1000 that had previously toured with Zebrahead, was advised by Udhus and Osmundson to try out for the part in December 2004, to which he won. Lewis' inclusion was announced at a private concert at the Anaheim House of Blues, California on March 8, 2005, before the group started recording their next studio album.

2006–2012: Broadcast to the World,  Phoenix, Panty Raid and Get Nice! 

Zebrahead's sixth album Broadcast to the World debuted in February 2006 in Japan, where it certified gold. It was later issued in other countries as the year progressed. During that time, the band toured the U.S. as part of the Warped Tour festival and later Europe, notably playing at the UK's annual Download Festival. Ali Tabatabaee and Matty Lewis also performed the theme of Sonic the Hedgehog (2006), "His World".

Following a two-month hiatus after writing material for their seventh album, Zebrahead returned to Europe in May 2007 on a co-headline tour with MxPx and went on to tour the UK as part of the annual Get Happy Tour the following October. Afterwards, the band continued writing and recorded demos with producers Jason Freese, Howard Benson and Cameron Webb. The album, Phoenix, was released in July 2008, preceded by the Not the New Album EP a day earlier. The band later returned to the UK and performed at the Download, Leeds Slam Dunk and Greenfield festivals, before going on to tour the rest of Europe and Japan for the remainder of the year. An American leg of the tour was originally planned to take place after, however, Lewis became ill, and in order to avoid permanent damage to his voice, the tour was cancelled.

In Spring 2009, Zebrahead announced the release of a cover album featuring songs originally sung by female musicians from the 1990s–2000s for the following November. Panty Raid is preceded by the single "Girlfriend" originally by Avril Lavigne. To promote it, the band began the Less Than Jake tour in late 2009 and toured through Japan and Europe, eventually concluding in the U.S. in Spring 2010. In the fall that followed, the band had started recording original material for the first time since the release of Phoenix. Proceeded by the singles "Ricky Bobby" and the title track "Get Nice!", Zebrahead's ninth studio album Get Nice! was released in July 2011, reaching No. 3 on the U.S. Top Heatseekers chart. Promotion came in the form of the tour Get Nice! or Die Trying, where the band performed in venues and festivals throughout Europe, Japan and Australia and the United States between the album's release and the summer of 2012.

2013–2020: Call Your Friends, Walk the Plank and Brain Invaders 
After recording in the first half of the year, Zebrahead's tenth studio album Call Your Friends was released worldwide in August 2013. Around the same time, the band announced the departure of guitarist Greg Bergdorf, who chose to leave in order to spend more time with his family. Lead guitarist of Death By Stereo, Dan Palmer took his place as the band's new guitarist. Zebrahead then toured in the U.S., Europe and Japan over the course of the following year, this time alongside acts MxPx and Allister. In October 2014, the band released their live DVD Way More Beer, which was filmed and recorded during the band's tour of Germany earlier that year.

In celebration of the twentieth anniversary of Zebrahead's formation, the band released their first compilation album Greatest Hits? – Volume 1 on March 11, 2015, exclusively in Japan. As well as familiar material, the compilation features several re-recorded songs from the band's earlier albums with former lead singer/rhythm guitarist Justin Mauriello, this time featuring current lead Matty Lewis. The re-recorded songs were released separately outside Japan as the band's eleventh studio album under the title The Early Years – Revisited on April 21, 2015.

After recording earlier in the year, Zebrahead's twelfth album Walk the Plank was issued on October 7, 2015. A continuation of their Walk the Plank/Out of Control tour that took place earlier that year ran between October 1 – December 11, 2015, in Japan and Europe. The band released a second compilation album on November 24, 2017, titled The Bonus Brothers, featuring songs that were previously only available on the Japanese editions of their albums, while their thirteenth studio album Brain Invaders was released in March 2019.

2021–present: Lewis' departure 
In April 2021, Zebrahead announced the departure of co-lead vocalist and rhythm guitarist, Matty Lewis. Adrian Estrella was revealed as his replacement on June 28, 2021. The band's first single with Estrella, "Lay Me to Rest", premiered the following month on July 30, 2021 while the EP III, the band's first release with Estrella, followed on November 26, 2021. The band's follow-up EP, titled II, was released on February 3, 2023.

Musical style 
Zebrahead has been classified under genres such as punk rock, pop punk, rap rock, rap metal, rapcore and ska punk.

Band members 

Current members
 Ali Tabatabaee – lead vocals (1996–present)
 Ben Osmundson – bass guitar, backing vocals (1996–present)
 Ed Udhus – drums, percussion (1996–present)
 Dan Palmer – lead guitar, backing vocals (2013–present; 2010, 2012 touring substitute for Greg Bergdorf)
 Adrian Estrella – lead vocals, rhythm guitar (2021–present)

Former members
 Justin Mauriello – lead vocals, rhythm guitar (1996–2004)
 Greg Bergdorf – lead guitar, backing vocals (1996–2013)
 Matty Lewis – lead vocals, rhythm guitar (2005–2021)

Touring and session members
 Howard Benson – keyboards (1998–2000, 2008)
 Jason Freese – keyboards, piano (2006–present)
 Dan Regan – trombone (occasional live appearances performing "Anthem"; 2006–2014)
 John Christianson – trumpet (occasional live appearances performing "Anthem"; 2006–present)
 Chris Dalley – drums (filled in for Ed Udhus on 2008 summer UK tour)

Timeline

Discography 

 Zebrahead (1998)
 Waste of Mind (1998)
 Playmate of the Year (2000)
 MFZB (2003)
 Waste of MFZB (2004)
 Broadcast to the World (2006)
 Phoenix (2008)
 Panty Raid (2009)
 Get Nice! (2011)
 Call Your Friends (2013)
 The Early Years – Revisited (2015)
 Walk the Plank (2015)
 Brain Invaders (2019)

References

External links 

 
 

Interviews
 Interview on Up Load UK 2009
 Interview on More Than the Music 2011 (Tess Askew)
 Zebrahead interview on AWR 2013

Punk rock groups from California
Rap rock groups
Rap metal musical groups
Rapcore groups
Alternative rock groups from California
Musical groups from Orange County, California
Musical quintets
Columbia Records artists
Musical groups established in 1996
Pop punk groups from California
1996 establishments in California
La Habra, California
American punk rock groups